Phoenicoparrus is a genus of birds in the flamingo family Phoenicopteridae. First established by Charles Lucien Bonaparte in 1856, it contains two species.

References

Phoenicopteridae
Taxa named by Charles Lucien Bonaparte
Taxonomy articles created by Polbot